Institute of Forest Genetics and Tree Breeding (IFGTB) is a Forestry Research institute situated in Coimbatore in Tamil Nadu. It works under the Indian Council of Forestry Research and Education (ICFRE) of  the Ministry of Environment, Forest and Climate Change, Government of India.Institute of Forest Genetics and Tree Breeding is a national institute formed in April, 1988 under the Indian Council of Forestry Research and Education (ICFRE), an autonomous council under the Ministry of Environment and Forests, Government of India. To identify and evolve varieties of species used in afforestation and social forestry that will contribute to the national goal of achieving a growth of 3 to 4 cubic meters of biomass per ha per year within the ecological considerations applicable to the area.

See also
 Indian Council of Forestry Research and Education

References

1988 establishments in Tamil Nadu
Government agencies established in 1988
Forest research institutes
Forestry agencies in India
Indian Council of Forestry Research and Education
Ministry of Environment, Forest and Climate Change
Sports venues in Coimbatore
Environmental organisations based in India